Freestyle skiing at the 2017 Asian Winter Games was held in Sapporo, Japan between 24–26 February at the Sapporo Bankei Ski Area. A total of four events were contested: men's and women's dual moguls and moguls.

Schedule

Medalists

Men

Women

Medal table

Participating nations
A total of 31 athletes from 7 nations competed in freestyle skiing at the 2017 Asian Winter Games:

 
 
 
 
 
 
 

* Australia as guest nation, was ineligible to win any medals.

References

External links
Official Results Book – Freestyle Skiing

 
2017 Asian Winter Games events
2017
2017
2017 in freestyle skiing